Powerhouse is a name used by several different fictional characters appearing in American comic books published by Marvel Comics.

Powerhouse (Rieg Davan)

Publication history
Powerhouse first appeared in Nova #2 (October 1976), and was created by Marv Wolfman, John Buscema, and Joe Sinnott.

The character subsequently appears in Nova #6-8 (February-April 1977), #10-11 (June-July 1977), #24-25 (March & May 1979), Fantastic Four #206 (May 1979), #208-209 (July–August 1979), and ROM #24 (November 1981).

Powerhouse appeared as part of the "Champions of Xandar" entry in the Official Handbook of the Marvel Universe Deluxe Edition #16.

Fictional character biography
Powerhouse is a member of Xandarian alien race, with superhuman strength and the ability to absorb energy from any source to temporarily enhance his physical strength fiftyfold, absorb the energy from a weapon used against him and redirect it against an assailant, and even create a psionic link with an opponent with whom he is in physical contact so as to control his opponent's use of his or her own powers.

Davan was a member of the Syfon division of the Nova Corps, Xandar's superhuman military.  He was sent into space to perform surveillance on the starship of Zorr, the interstellar warlord who went on to shatter Xandar.  Before Davan could report on Zorr's activities, his ship was hit by a meteor shower and careened off-course, eventually crossing the space of galaxies and landing in a body of water on Earth.  Davan's ship was found by the Avian criminal Condor, who brainwashed Davan into serving him. Eventually Davan regained his memory and returned to Xandar, serving in the Champions of Xandar.

He was killed fighting the forces of Nebula.

Powers and abilities
Powerhouse had superhuman strength, and the ability to siphon the energies of any power-source, including living beings.

Powerhouse: the 1990s mutant 

Her first appearance was in Spider-Man  #15 (1991).

At some point, under uncertain circumstances, Powerhouse developed mutant powers and a strong hatred for humanity.

Beast was giving a lecture at ESU on genetics and Powerhouse decided to show up and send her anti-human message there. Simultaneously, a mutant hater called Masterblaster decided to make his presence and opinions felt at the same lecture. Though it is unclear whether one of them influenced the other's actions at the lecture, Masterblaster came to attack Beast, and Powerhouse attacked humans there and the Beast came to their aid and fought Powerhouse. They fought back and forth, with Powerhouse having the upper hand until Spider-Man showed up. While Spider-Man kept Powerhouse busy, Beast knocked out Masterblaster and the two proceeded to team up on Powerhouse, and defeated her, knocking her out. She was presumably taken into police custody.

Wolverine and Warbird saw a news report of Powerhouse attacking the area around the U.N. building, where an international debate on human-mutant relations was to happen. She was attacking everything in sight as a symbol of the way humans' attitude towards mutants was. Before long, Wolverine and Warbird joined the fight, and Wolverine was flown into the air and landed on top of Powerhouse so they could fight. However, Powerhouse started draining Wolverine's energy and Warbird was doing more harm than good because she was drunk and being very reckless with her energy blasts. Eventually, Powerhouse knocked out Warbird. Without the drunk Warbird to get in his way, Wolverine managed to defeat Powerhouse.

Powerhouse joined with Masterblaster in robbing a local bank, but were interrupted by Spider-Man, who defeated the duo. One of the men present at the bank at the time of the hold-up became infatuated with Powerhouse, and subsequently visited her in prison, which he intended to continue to do every two weeks for the next seven years, as she served her sentence.

Powers and abilities
Powerhouse has the ability to drain energy of other living things to increase her own power. She can absorb energy through contact with a victim, even brief contact like a punch. She has demonstrated the ability to fly, shoot destructive energy blasts, and superhuman strength to an unknown degree. However, it is unknown if she has any of these powers unless she has absorbed sufficient amounts of energy or whether they are independent within her. It is also unknown if she requires this energy to survive and if so, how often she needs to feed.

Powerhouse (Alex Power) 

An alias used by Power Pack leader Alex Power as a member of the New Warriors.

References

Characters created by John Buscema
Characters created by Marv Wolfman
Comics characters introduced in 1976
Marvel Comics characters with superhuman strength
Marvel Comics mutants
Marvel Comics superheroes
Marvel Comics supervillains